Zindzi Okenyo is a television and theatre actress and musician from Sydney. A graduate of the National Institute of Dramatic Art (NIDA), she is a presenter on Play School, and performs music professionally under the stage name Okenyo. She is best known for the song "Woman's World", from her debut EP album, The Wave.

Career

Music
In 2013, Okenyo signed to the promotional label Niche Productions, and in 2016 to indie record Label Elefant Traks. Her debut single, "Broken Chest", was released in November 2013.
"Woman's World" was nominated for Best Song on FBi Radio in 2017.  The song was chosen for the Women's National Basketball League 2017 Campaign, and was also used in a US Apple Instagram Promotion. Authors at the Noisey site, operated by Vice (magazine), said of the song: "There is a self-awareness and empowerment in the lyrics and a defiant resolve in the message as she identifies misrepresentation in gender and sexual stereotypes" with comparisons to artists like Erykah Badu and Janelle Monae. Okenyo and her song featured in the documentary Her Sound, Her Story" about the "inequality of women in the Australian Music Industry".

"Woman's World 2.0" is a remix of "Woman's World" featuring Miss Blanks and Jesswar. The song was featured in VicHealth's "This Girl Can - Victoria" television ad campaign.

Okenyo has performed gigs with Santigold and Billie Eilish, played at Splendour In the Grass and VIVID Sydney, and recently played her first run of headline shows.

Television
Okenyo's television credits include Play School, the role of Amanda in the Australian television series Sisters, journalist Millie Hussey in the television drama series The Code, and Sophie in the series Janet King.

In 2018, reflecting on her success as an actor and musician, she said, "It's really exciting because my identity and my artistry are starting to work together... I always imagined that happening because it's really important to me to explain myself and express myself in different ways."

Theatre
Okenyo has performed in the following theatre productions:
An Ideal Husband, Melbourne Theatre Company
Antony and Cleopatra, Sydney Opera House
La traviata, Belvoir St Theatre
Gaybies, Eternity Playhouse

References

Further reading

External links
 

Australian musicians
Year of birth missing (living people)
Living people
Australian film actresses
Australian hip hop singers
Australian people of Nigerian descent
Australian stage actresses
Australian television actresses
21st-century Australian actresses
21st-century Australian singers
21st-century Australian women singers
Australian soul singers
Australian contemporary R&B singers
People from Sydney
Actresses from Sydney
Singers from Sydney